LGBT rights in the Balkans may be covered in the following articles:

 Albania
 Bosnia and Herzegovina
 Bulgaria
 Croatia
 Greece
 Montenegro
 North Macedonia
 Romania
 Serbia
 Kosovo
 Slovenia
 Turkey

See also
 Cyprus
 Northern Cyprus
 Moldova
 Transnistria

LGBT rights by region
Balkans